Miguel Ángel Frechilla Manrique (born Valladolid, February 1, 1974) is a Spanish rugby union player. He plays as a fullback. He is nicknamed Mathaus due to his physical likeness to the German footballer Lothar Matthaus.

Career
His first international cap was during a match against Portugal, at Murrayfield, on December 2, 1998. He was part of the 1999 Rugby World Cup roster, playing all the three matches. His last international cap was against Georgia, at Tbilisi, on February 22, 2003.

References

External links

1974 births
Living people
Sportspeople from Valladolid
Spanish rugby union players
Rugby union fullbacks
Spain international rugby union players